The 1992 Indonesia Open in badminton was held in Semarang, from September 16 to September 20, 1992. It was a five-star tournament and the prize money was US$166,000.

Venue
GOR Jatidiri

Final results

External links
Smash: 1992 Indonesian Open

Indonesia Open (badminton)
Indonesia
1992 in Indonesian sport
Semarang